Joest Racing is a sports car racing team that was established in 1978 by former Porsche works racer Reinhold Joest. Their headquarters are in Wald-Michelbach, Germany.

Early years
As a combined driver/team owner, Reinhold Joest first began to race a Porsche 908/3 in the European Sportscar Championship, winning the driver's title. He then switched to Porsche 935s, winning the 24 Hours of Daytona in 1980. The team won the DRM back to back with driver Bob Wollek, in 1982 and 1983. During the 1982 season, whilst the Porsche 956 was only available to the works team, Joest adapted a roof onto a Porsche 936 to enter the Group C World Endurance Championship. They would race the car into the 1983 season until they took delivery of their 956 prior to Le Mans.

Le Mans successes
In 1984, in absence of the works team, Joest Racing would score the first of their fifteen wins at the 24 Hours of Le Mans, with Klaus Ludwig and Henri Pescarolo driving their "lucky #7" car a Porsche 956, chassis number 117. In 1985, the works team returned, and despite having little factory support, they defended their title with Ludwig, Paolo Barilla and incognito German businessman "John Winter" driving the #7 chassis number 117 again. This would make them the second team to score back to back wins with the same car, the other being JW Automotive whose Ford GT40 Mk.I won in 1968 and 1969.

In 1986, 1988, and 1989 Joest won the ADAC Supercup title for teams and Wollek winning the drivers cup in 1989. They also took the Interserie title for drivers with Winter in 1985 and Bernd Schneider in 1991, and the teams title in 1991.

In 1989, FIA introduced the new 3.5 litre Formula One engine rule to Group C, which not many teams were happy about, because few, if any, such engines were available to privateer teams like Joest. The previous fuel economy based rules were gradually phased out in favour of short races with cars that were virtually two-seater Formula 1 cars; existing Group C cars such as Joest's Porsche 962s were given higher weights and lower fuel allocation to make them less competitive. The team would instead compete in the IMSA GTP category beginning in 1990, winning the 24 Hours of Daytona in 1991 with Wollek, Pescarolo, Frank Jelinski, "Winter" and Hurley Haywood. With their Porsche 962 now being outmoded by the Nissans, Jaguars and Toyotas, the team would not score any more victories. In 1993, the Nissan and TWR Jaguar team had withdrawn, and the AAR Eagle Toyota would continue to dominate the series final year. Joest managed to score the car's last IMSA victory at the Road America 500, due to Toyota's absence.

Joest and Opel
In the 1990s, the team also had a successful career developing and racing an Opel Calibra in the Deutsche Tourenwagen Meisterschaft (DTM). They first won the ITR Gold Cup at the Donington Park round in 1994 with Manuel Reuter driving, when the leading Alfa Romeo of Alessandro Nannini was disqualified for running out of fuel. They would continue to have a successful career there by the time the series became a full-fledged international championship (ITC), winning the title for the final year in 1996 for Opel.

Return to Le Mans

In late 1995, Tom Walkinshaw Racing were commissioned by Porsche to produce a WSC car to compete in the 1996 Daytona 24-hour race. The resulting Porsche WSC-95 was based on the TWR's 1991 Jaguar XJR-14 chassis, with the roof removed and a flat-six Porsche engine fitted. The car was withdrawn because of a sudden rule change. For 1996 the concept was revived and Joest were chosen to run the WSC-95s at Le Mans as backup for Porsche's own team of works 911 GT1s. Joest won the race with Davy Jones, Manuel Reuter, and Alexander Wurz. They returned in 1997, this time without works support, but again with the same car wearing #7. The winning pilots were by Michele Alboreto, Stefan Johansson and Tom Kristensen, the latter scoring the first of his nine wins. As with the #7 956 of the 1980s, Joest attempted for a third straight win, although without success, as neither car finished, while Porsche itself prevailed in the 1998 race.

Audi Sport Team Joest

In 1998, after being associated with Porsche for many years, the team signed a works contract with Audi (its CEO being Ferdinand Piëch, a grandson of Porsche) to support them for the 1999 24 Hours of Le Mans. Joest helped them build and develop the Audi R8R. Audi, not being sure which concept was the better one, also supported an LM-GTP entry, the R8C, developed by RTN. While the British R8Cs never worked properly, the two Joest R8R were reliable, yet too slow to finish better than 3rd and 4th against one of the works BMW V12 LMR and a Toyota GT-One.

Audi and Joest went back to develop the highly successful R8, winning its maiden race at the 2000 12 Hours of Sebring, and going on the win at Le Mans. Between 2000 and 2002, the R8 cars took a hat-trick of wins at Le Mans, Sebring, and Petit Le Mans, as well as American Le Mans Series titles in each year.

Audi scaled their sports car racing operation down at the end of 2002, preferring to focus their attention on the Bentley Speed 8 for a year, allowing it to win in 2003 (with support by Joest mechanics).  In 2004, Audi returned to DTM touring car racing, now officially backing up the Abt Sportsline effort which had been called "private" since 2000. Joest and Abt fielded Audi A4s in the series.

In 2006, Joest began racing the new diesel-powered Audi R10 sports car. They began the 2006 season with a win at the 12 Hours of Sebring, and took also the 2006 24 Hours of Le Mans, replicating that performance a year later and again in 2008, both times against Peugeot's diesel 908 HDi FAP coupe.

In 2009, Joest and Audi introduced the Audi R15 sports car, the replacement for the R10. However, reliability issues allowed Peugeot to finish first and second at the 2009 24 Hours of Le Mans, with their 908 HDi FAP which had been perfected over its three-year history.

In an answer to the 2009 issues, Audi reworked the R15 for 2010 (under the R15 TDI plus designation) with a higher reliability factor; unexpected Peugeot reliability issues of the 908 HDi FAP forced all four cars (including one by Oreca) to retire before the end of the race and resulted in a clean sweep of the podium in the 2010 24 Hours of Le Mans, with all three cars running farther than the former  race record, despite that the R15s were not using the V10 TDI engines at full and were not running faster than the four 908s.

In 2011, the Audi R18 TDI won the 24 Hours of Le Mans despite the loss of 2 cars (both via crashes with slower GT Ferraris claiming Allan McNish in car 3 and then Mike Rockenfeller in car 1; the sole survivor, car 2, was the winner) and a ferocious pace from the opposing Peugeots. The R18s failed to win any of the other races in the Intercontinental Le Mans Cup that year, however, handing the team and drive titles to Peugeot.

For the first part of 2012, with the collapse of the Peugeot racing program, Audi has run near-unopposed in the first races of the 2012 FIA World Endurance Championship. The R18 TDI won the 2012 12 Hours of Sebring in its last race and its successor, the Audi R18 Ultra, won the 2012 6 Hours of Spa-Francorchamps with the related R18 E-Tron Quattro finishing in 2nd place. In the 2012 24 Hours of Le Mans, Joest Racing Audis won the top 3 positions with two R18 E-Tron Quattros finishing 1st and 2nd and one Audi R18 Ultra taking 3rd.

After Le Mans, Audi won 2 further rounds of the FIA World Endurance Championship, the 2012 6 Hours of Silverstone and the 2012 6 Hours of Bahrain. While handing the other three rounds to Toyota, Audi would win the LMP1 Manufacturer Championship 2012 and helped Andre Lotterer, Bernoit Treleuyer and Marcel Fässler to become Driver World Endurance Champions 2012.

In late 2016, Audi Sport announced that they would leave the FIA World Endurance Championship.

GT3
Audi Sport Team Joest entered a pair of Audi R8 LMS GT3's in the 2011 Bathurst 12 Hour held at the Mount Panorama Circuit, Bathurst, Australia on 6 February. Both cars qualified on the front row with the team of Marc Basseng, Christopher Mies and Darryl O'Young leading home Australian team mates Mark Eddy, Craig Lowndes and Warren Luff in a 1-2 finish. With both cars on the same lap racing for the win, the margin was only 0.7141 between the two at the end of 12 hours of racing. The Joest Racing R8's finished one lap in front of the VIP Pet Foods Racing Porsche 997 GT3 Cup R of Craig Baird and father and son pairing Tony and Klark Quinn.

It was Joest's 2nd win in Australia in two starts having previously won the ALMS Race of a Thousand Years on 31 December 2000 with Dindo Capello and Allan McNish winning in an Audi R8 LMP on the old Grand Prix circuit in Adelaide, South Australia. Capello easily put the R8 on pole position, while McNish was actually laid up with a bad back after he put it out when stepping out of his Kilt after a pre-event photo shoot. They also had to drive a repaired car after Capello put the crocodile liveried car into the tyre barriers in the race morning warm up session. Despite his troubles, McNish started the race and set the fastest lap. He also drove the 25 laps required and wrapped up the inaugural ALMS Drivers' title as a result.

Mazda Team Joest
On 18 July 2017 it was announced that Joest Racing would take over the operation of the Mazda RT24-P Daytona Prototype International (DPi) entry in the WeatherTech SportsCar Championship for the 2018 season. Mazda withdrew from the remainder of the 2017 season in order for Joest to spearhead testing and development of the then uncompetitive DPi.

The partnership was terminated at the end of March 2020 with Mazda moving to Multimatic Motorsports.

Glickenhaus
In 2021 it was announced that Joest would work with Podium Advanced Technologies to assist in the running of Scuderia Cameron Glickenhaus' new Hypercar programme, entering two SCG 007 Hypercars in the 2021 FIA World Endurance Championship.

WeatherTech SportsCar Championship wins

References

External links

 

German auto racing teams
Auto racing teams established in 1978
1978 establishments in Germany
24 Hours of Le Mans teams
American Le Mans Series teams
FIA Sportscar Championship entrants
Deutsche Tourenwagen Masters teams
British Touring Car Championship teams
World Sportscar Championship teams
FIA World Endurance Championship teams
European Le Mans Series teams
WeatherTech SportsCar Championship teams
Audi in motorsport